= Robert A. Athey =

American lawyer and politician

Member of the Kentucky House of Representatives from Fayette County
- In office 1850–1851

Mayor of Covington
- In office 1874–1890
- Preceded by: Leander Evans Baker
- Succeeded by: W. P. McLaughlin

Personal details
- Born: December 19, 1825 Lexington, Kentucky, U.S
- Died: April 17, 1901 (aged 75) Covington, Kentucky, U.S
- Party: Whig

Robert A. Athey (December 19, 1825 – April 17, 1901) was an American lawyer and politician who repersented Fayette County in the Kentucky House of Representatives and served as mayor of Covington.

== Biography ==
Athey was born in Lexington, Kentucky, and he was educated at Transylvania University. He served as a member of the Lexington City Council in 1849 and represented Fayette County in the Kentucky House of Representatives from 1850 to 1851, in 1855 he moved to Covington and served as mayor of the city from 1874 to 1890, he died in 1901 at his apartment in Covington.
